Vahid Jalalzadeh (born in Urmia, West Azerbaijan) is an Iranian politician, and the governor of West Azerbaijan since 2009 to 2013 in the Government of Mahmoud Ahmadinejad.
Vahid Jalalzadeh as the head of the parliament's Commission of National-Security and Foreign-Policy (of Islamic Parliament of I.R.Iran) was elected by a majority vote of the commission's members on 21 June 2021.

References

People from Urmia
Living people
1968 births
Governors of West Azerbaijan Province